Rik Reinerink (born 21 May 1973) is a Dutch former road cyclist, who competed as a professional from 1999 to 2006.

Major results

1991
 3rd Overall Giro della Lunigiana
 3rd Trofeo Emilio Paganessi
 4th Road race, UCI Junior Road World Championships
1992
 1st Stage 1 Tour of Austria
1994
 2nd Ronde van Drenthe
 3rd Ronde van Limburg
1995
 3rd Road race, National Under-23 Road Championships
1996
 1st Round van Zuid-Holland
 1st Stage 10 Olympia's Tour
1997
 10th Overall Circuit Franco-Belge
1999
 1st Ster van Zwolle
 3rd Ronde van Overijssel
 7th Prix d'Armor, Mi-Août en Bretagne
 9th Overall Olympia's Tour
1st Stage 2
 9th Ronde van Drenthe
2000
 2nd Ster van Zwolle
2001
 5th Brussels–Ingooigem
2002
 1st Stage 6 Ster Elektrotoer
 3rd GP Aarhus
 4th Ronde van Drenthe
 4th Le Samyn
2003
 1st Stage 5 Ronde van Nederland
 3rd Overall Ster Elektrotoer
1st Mountains classification
 3rd GP Stad Vilvoorde
 4th Overall Circuit Franco-Belge
 4th Tour Beneden-Maas
 6th Ronde van Noord-Holland
 6th Omloop van de Vlaamse Scheldeboorden
 9th GP Aarhus
2004
 1st Noord-Nederland Tour (with 21 others)
 5th Classic Haribo
 7th Paris–Brussels
 7th Omloop van het Waasland
 9th Nationale Sluitingprijs
2005
 3rd Tour de Rijke
 5th Ronde van Midden-Zeeland
 8th GP Stad Zottegem
 10th Nationale Sluitingprijs
2006
 2nd GP Herning

References

External links 

1973 births
Living people
People from Tubbergen
Dutch male cyclists
Cyclists from Overijssel